Parornix ornatella is a moth of the family Gracillariidae. It is known from Austria.

The larvae feed on Amelanchier ovalis. They mine the leaves of their host plant.

References

Parornix
Moths of Europe
Moths described in 1981